Paul Gludovatz (10 June 1946 – 12 November 2021) was an Austrian football manager.

Career
He managed Austrian national youth football teams in different age brackets from 1981 to 2008.

Death
Gludovatz died from complications of COVID-19 on 12 November 2021, amid the COVID-19 pandemic in Austria. He was 75.

References

1946 births
2021 deaths
Austrian football managers
SV Ried managers
TSV Hartberg managers
People from Güssing District
Deaths from the COVID-19 pandemic in Austria
Sportspeople from Burgenland
Burgenland Croats